Aruthu is a 1976 Indian Malayalam-language film, directed by Ravi. The film stars Kamal Haasan, Sumithra, M. G. Soman and Kaviyoor Ponnamma in the lead roles. The film has musical score by G. Devarajan. The film was a remake of the Hindi film Khel Khel Mein.

Cast 
 
Kamal Haasan
Sumithra
M. G. Soman
Kaviyoor Ponnamma 
Sankaradi
Surasu
P. A. Thomas

Production 
Aruthu film produced by Som Prakash under production banner Sun Flower Productions. This film was shot in black-and-white. It was given an "U" (Unrestricted) certificate by the Central Board of Film Certification.

Soundtrack 
The music was composed by G. Devarajan and the lyrics were written by Yusufali Kechery.

References

External links 
 

1976 films
1970s Malayalam-language films